Baling twine or baler twine is a small diameter sisal or synthetic twine used to bind a quantity of fibrous material (notably hay or straw) into a more compact and easily stacked form.

Traditional sisal baler twine is naturally biodegradable.

References

External links

Ropework